Francisco de Borja Valenzuela Ríos (10 October 1917 – 20 February 1998) was a Chilean bishop. After his episcopal consecration, he headed the dioceses of Copiapó -at the time, a territorial prelature- (1956–57), Antofagasta (1957–74), Calama (1965–68, 1970), San Felipe (1974–83), and Valparaíso (1983–93). He attended all four sessions of the Second Vatican Council.

References

1917 births
1998 deaths
Roman Catholic bishops of Valparaíso
Roman Catholic archbishops of Antofagasta
Roman Catholic bishops of San Juan de Calama
Roman Catholic bishops of Copiapó